Claude Mérelle (born Lise Henriette Marie Laurent; 17 May 1888 – 16 December 1976) was a French stage and film actress who appeared in numerous films during the silent film era of the early 1910s through the late 1920s.

Career
Claude Mérelle was born Lise Henriette Marie Laurent in Colombes, France in 1888, she made her film debut in the 1912 short Les noces siciliennes, directed by Louis Feuillade. She would go on to appear in numerous film serials throughout the 1910s under the name Lise Laurent and directed by filmmakers such as Feuillade, Henri Pouctal and Henri Diamant-Berger before using the stage name Claude Mérelle beginning in 1918. Mérelle most often appeared in film serials throughout her career, such as 1924's Les aventures de Robinson Crusoé, directed by Gaston Leprieur; 1924's Les amours de Rocambole, directed by Charles Maudru; 1925's Jean Chouans, directed by Luitz-Morat; 1926's Le capitaine Rascasse, Henri Desfontaines and 1926's Le juif errant, directed by Luitz-Morat. Her final film appearance was in the 1928 drama Rapa-Nui (also known as The Golden Abyss) directed by Mario Bonnard and starring André Roanne.

Personal life
Claude Mérelle was married to stage and film actor Albert Decoeur from 1923 until his death in 1942. The two had appeared in several films together. She retired from films in 1928 and died in Nice in 1976 at age 88.

Selected filmography

References

External links

1888 births
1976 deaths
French stage actresses
French film actresses
French silent film actresses
People from Colombes
20th-century French actresses